Blue Skies, Broken Hearts...Next 12 Exits is the second studio album by the American pop punk band  The Ataris. It was released on Kung Fu Records on April 13, 1999. The album cover is the neon sign for the Blue Skies Mobile Park in Santa Barbara, California, taken by Roe. In December 1999, the band went on a midwest/west coast tour with MxPx.

Reception

Cleveland.com ranked "San Dimas High School Rules" at number 44 on their list of the top 100 pop-punk songs.

Track listing

"My Hotel Year" was originally recorded from the band's previous EP Look Forward to Failure, and was re-recorded for the album as an acoustic version.

Personnel

The Ataris
Kris Roe – Lead vocals, rhythm guitar 
Michael Davenport – Bass guitar, backing vocals
Patrick Riley – Lead guitar, backing vocals
Chris Knapp - Drums

Artwork
Grace Walker – Art Direction
Kris Roe  – Design & Layout, photography
Patrick Riley – Design & Layout
Larry Mills – Live photography

Production
Joey Cape – Producer, mixing 
Angus Cooke – Engineer    
Jason Livermore – Mixing at The Blasting Room, Ft. Collins, CO

Management
Alan Mintz – Legal Representation

References

External links

Blue Skies, Broken Hearts...Next 12 Exits at YouTube (streamed copy where licensed)

The Ataris albums
1999 albums
Kung Fu Records albums
Albums produced by Joey Cape